Wacław Szybalski (9 September 1921 – 16 December 2020) was a Polish-American professor of oncology at the McArdle Laboratory for Cancer Research, University of Wisconsin–Madison Medical School.

Life
Wacław Szybalski was born in September 1921 in Lwów, Poland, into a Polish intelligentsia family. His father Stefan was an engineer, and his mother, Michalina née Rakowska, was a Doctor of Chemistry. The Szybalski family maintained close friendships with numerous leading representatives of the Polish intelligentsia in Lwów, including Professor Jan Czekanowski, the father of Polish anthropology, and the bacteriologist, Professor Rudolf Stefan Weigl.

In 1939 Szybalski graduated from the famous Gymnasium no. 8 in Lwów. After World War II broke out, from 23 September 1939, Lwów was occupied by the Soviet Union. Szybalski joined the Chemistry Department at the Lwów Polytechnic, where he was captivated by the lectures of Professor Adolf Joszt, a leading expert on processes of fermentation. Joszt even then held a vision of developing science in the direction of genetic engineering and biotechnology, which had a direct influence on Szybalski's future scientific development. After the German attack on the Soviet Union, in 1941 Lwów was occupied by the Nazis. Szybalski survived the occupation by working as a feeder of lice in Rudolf Weigl's institute for typhus research.

Szybalski subsequently emigrated to the United States and became a professor of oncology at the McArdle Laboratory for Cancer Research, University of Wisconsin–Madison Medical School.

He died in December 2020 in Madison, Wisconsin at the age of 99.

See also
Szybalski's rule
List of Poles
 He is a member of the Kosciuszko Foundation Collegium of Eminent Scientists of Polish Origin and Ancestry (2014)

References

External links 
 Summary of current research
 Professor Waclaw Szybalski Foundation
 Conference: „50 years of gene therapy: the contribution of Professor Waclaw Szybalski to science and humanity" Polish Academy of Arts and Sciences (PAU), 28-29.09.2012, Cracow

1921 births
2020 deaths
Scientists from Lviv
Polish oncologists
Lviv Polytechnic alumni
Polish emigrants to the United States
University of Wisconsin–Madison faculty